The Belgium women's national football team represents Belgium in international women's football. The team is fielded by the Royal Belgian Football Association (KBVB/URBSFA), the governing body of football in Belgium, and competes as a member of the Union of European Football Associations (UEFA). Belgium competed in their first international match on 30 May 1976, a 2–1 win in a friendly against France. More than 260 players have made at least one international appearance for the team.

List of players 
This list includes all players who have made at least one appearance for the national team. Players that are still active at the club and/or international level are in bold. All statistics are correct up to and including the match played on 06 September 2022 against .

See also 
 :Category:Belgium women's international footballers

References 

 
Belgium
International footballers
footballers
Association football player non-biographical articles